Fakhrabad (also Romanized as Fakhrābād) is a village in Razmavaran Rural District, in the Central District of Rafsanjan County, Kerman Province, Iran. At the 2006 census, its population was 1,008, in 249 families.

References 

Populated places in Rafsanjan County